Claude Dambury (born 30 July 1971) is a former French football player.

Club statistics

National team statistics

References

External links

WEB SOCCER MAGAZINE

1971 births
Living people
French Guianan footballers
French Guiana international footballers
French Guianan expatriate footballers
French footballers
Ligue 1 players
Ligue 2 players
Championnat National players
J1 League players
FC Gueugnon players
Gamba Osaka players
US Créteil-Lusitanos players
FC Martigues players
Stade de Reims players
Expatriate footballers in Japan
Association football defenders